Joseph Slater may refer to:

 Joseph Slater Sr. (1750–1805), British painter, father of Joseph Slater Jr.
 Joseph Slater Jr. (1782–1837), British portrait painter
 Joseph Slater, Baron Slater (1904–1977), British Labour Party politician
 Joseph E. Slater (1922–2002), American economist, president and chief executive of the Aspen Institute